Traci Bartlett (born 17 May 1972) is an Australian former soccer player who played as a defender. She played for the Australian national team, nicknamed the Matildas, from 1991 to 2001, appearing in a total of 64 international matches. Bartlett played club soccer for Marconi, Canberra Eclipse and Queensland Sting.

References

1972 births
Living people
Women's association football defenders
Australia women's international soccer players
1995 FIFA Women's World Cup players
1999 FIFA Women's World Cup players
Australian women's soccer players